Eric Coutts (30 December 1913 – 16 August 2001) was an Australian rules footballer who played with Essendon in the Victorian Football League (VFL).

Notes

External links 
		

1913 births
2001 deaths
Australian rules footballers from Victoria (Australia)
Essendon Football Club players
Daylesford Football Club players